William Eadie may refer to:
 William Eadie (cricketer) (1864–1914), English cricketer
 William Eadie (footballer) (1882–1915), Scottish football goalkeeper
 Ax (wrestler) (William Reid Eadie, born 1947), known as Bill, American professional wrestler 
 Bill Eadie (footballer) (William Philip Eadie, 1882–?), Scottish football centre-half